Manhunt is an American reality television series that aired on UPN in 2001.

The contestants on the show posed as fugitives who tried to escape actors who pretended to be bounty hunters.  The one who eluded the bounty hunters the longest would receive a cash prize.

Manhunt was plagued with problems during its brief run.  First, a deal collapsed with the World Wrestling Federation (where SmackDown! aired in the same network) in which a number of their "superstars" were to be a part of the show's cast. Then, the bottom fell out when separate investigative reports by Peter Lance and game-show enthusiast Steve Beverly revealed that portions of the show were being filmed at Griffith Park in Los Angeles, California, rather than entirely on location in Hawaii as claimed. The show was originally shot in Hawaii, but portions were later reshot at Griffith Park after the producers were not satisfied with the original material. It later came out that Paramount Television had convinced a producer to rig the show in favor of a particular contestant, which violated FCC regulations put in place following the 1950s quiz show scandals.

The program was pulled after six episodes.

John Cena (then a WWE developmental talent) and former American Gladiator Raye "Zap" Hollitt were among the cast members.

References

External links
 
 Manhunt overview on Reality News Online

UPN original programming
2000s American reality television series
2001 American television series debuts
2001 American television series endings
English-language television shows
Entertainment scandals